Kottelatlimia is a genus of loaches found in Southeast Asia.

Species
There are currently three recognized species in this genus:
 Kottelatlimia hipporhynchos Kottelat & H. H. Tan, 2008
 Kottelatlimia katik (Kottelat & K. K. P. Lim, 1992)
 Kottelatlimia pristes (T. R. Roberts, 1989)

References

Cobitidae
Taxa named by Teodor T. Nalbant